= Journal of Emotional and Behavioral Disorders =

Journal of Emotional And Behavioral Disorders
- Discipline: Education
- Language: English
- Edited by: Elizabeth M. Farmer, Thomas W. Farmer

Publication details
- History: 1993-present
- Publisher: SAGE Publications (United States)
- Frequency: Quarterly
- Impact factor: 1.2 (2017)

Standard abbreviations
- ISO 4: J. Emot. Behav. Disord.

Indexing
- ISSN: 1063-4266 (print); 1538-4799 (web)
- LCCN: 93659129
- OCLC no.: 26024532

Links
- Journal homepage; Online access; Online archive

Journal of Emotional and Behavioral Disorders is a peer-reviewed academic journal that publishes papers in the field of Education. The journal's editors are Elizabeth M. Farmer and Thomas W. Farmer (University of Pittsburgh). It has been in publication since 1993 and is currently published by SAGE Publications in association with Hammill Institute on Disabilities.

== Scope ==
Journal of Emotional and Behavioral Disorders contains interdisciplinary research, practice, and commentary related to individuals with emotional and behavioral disabilities. The journal covers critical and diverse topics such as youth violence, functional assessment and school-wide discipline.

== Abstracting and indexing ==
Journal of Emotional and Behavioral Disorders is abstracted and indexed in, among other databases, SCOPUS and the Social Sciences Citation Index. According to the Journal Citation Reports, its 2017 impact factor is 1.2, ranking it 19 out of 40 journals in the category ‘Education, Special’.
